Koundinyasana (IAST: kauṇḍinyāsana), or Sage Kaundinya's pose, is a hand-balancing asana in modern yoga as exercise. It may be performed with both legs bent (Dvi Pada Koundinyasana), or with one leg over the supporting arm, the other leg straight (Eka Pada Koundinyasana).
Eka Pada Galavasana (Flying Pigeon Pose) has one leg bent, the foot hooked over the opposite arm under the body.

Etymology and origins 

The pose is named after Kaundinya, an Indian sage, and āsana meaning "posture" or "seat". The variations for one and two legs include the Sanskrit words for one (ek) or two (dvi), and pada meaning "foot".

The pose is not described in medieval hatha yoga. It appears in the 20th century among the asanas described by B. K. S. Iyengar in his 1966 book Light on Yoga, and those taught by Pattabhi Jois in Mysore in his Ashtanga Vinyasa Yoga. Both Iyengar and Jois were pupils of Krishnamacharya.

Description 

Koundinyasana is traditionally entered from tripod headstand, a variant of Sirsasana, but one can also get into the asana from Parsva Bakasana. The knee needs to be far enough up the triceps of the opposite arm before bending the elbows to engage the core muscles and help to prevent the leg from sliding down.

Variations 

Eka Pada Koundinyasana has one leg stretched out straight in line with the body.

Eka Pada Galavasana (Flying Pigeon Pose) has one leg bent, the foot hooked over the opposite arm under the body. The full pose, Galavasana, has the legs crossed in Padmasana, one knee tucked between the arms.

See also 

 Astavakrasana, a similar twisting arm-balancing asana
 List of asanas

References

Sources

 

Balancing asanas
Asymmetric asanas